The Apostolic Vicariate of Ucayali was a Roman Catholic apostolic vicariate (missionary pre-diocesan jurisdiction) located in the north-east of Peru. It was exempt, i.e. directly subject to the Holy See, not part of any ecclesiastical province.

History 
 It was established on February 5, 1900 as Apostolic Prefecture of Ucayali, on territory split off from the Diocese of Ayacucho o Huamanga and Diocese of Huánuco.
 On July 14, 1925, it was promoted to Apostolic Vicariate (hence entitled to a titular bishop; the incumbent was elevated) of Ucayali.
 It was suppressed on March 2, 1956 and its territory divided between three other new created Apostolic vicariates: Apostolic Vicariate of San Ramon, Apostolic Vicariate of Requena and Apostolic Vicariate of Pucallpa.

Incumbent ordinaries 
all incumbents were missionary members of the Latin (Roman rite) congregation of Friars Minor (Franciscans, O.F.M.)
 Apostolic Prefects of Ucayali  
 Friar Augustin Alemany, O.F.M. (February 14, 1905 – September 1905)
 Friar Bernardo Irastorza, O.F.M. (September 1905 – 1912)
 Friar Francisco Miguel Irazola y Galarza, O.F.M. (January 28, 1913 – July 14, 1925 see below)

 Apostolic Vicars of Ucayali
 Bishop Francisco Miguel Irazola y Galarza, O.F.M., Titular Bishop of Flavias (see above July 14, 1925 – 1939)
 Bishop León Bonaventura de Uriarte Bengoa, O.F.M., Titular Bishop of Madaurus (July 10, 1940 – March 2, 1956) (later Apostolic Vicar of San Ramon)

References 
 GCatholic.org, with incumbent biography links
 Catholic Hierarchy

Roman Catholic dioceses in Peru
Apostolic vicariates
Christian organizations established in 1900
Roman Catholic dioceses and prelatures established in the 19th century
Former Roman Catholic dioceses in America